Tequila Mockingbird is an album by the American jazz pianist Ramsey Lewis, released in 1977 on Columbia Records. The album peaked at No. 6 on the Billboard Jazz Albums chart.

The title track, composed by Larry Dunn, was released as a single in February 1978.

Overview
Tequila Mockingbird was produced by Bert De Couteaux and Larry Dunn. EWF guitarists Al McKay and Johnny Graham and bassist Verdine White contribute to the album, along with the horn production of Eddie del Barrio.

The LP's title track also appears on five of Ramsey Lewis's compilation albums.

Covers
Dee Dee Bridgewater recorded a version of "Tequila Mockingbird", with lyrics written by Roxanne Seeman, on her 1979 studio album Bad For Me.

Track listing

Personnel

Ramsey Lewis - piano (all tracks), harpsichord (all tracks), Fender Rhodes (all tracks), Mini-Moog (all tracks), rhythm tracks (2, 4-7)
Larry Dunn - keyboards and synthesizer programming (1, 8)
Verdine White - bass (1, 3, 8)
Leon Ndugu Chancler - drums and timbales (1, 8)
Philip Bailey - percussion (1), congas (3, 8)
Al McKay - guitar (1, 3, 8)
Ronnie Laws - soprano saxophone (1)
Eddie Del Barrio - horn arrangements (1, 3, 8), horn conductor (1, 3, 8), electric piano (8)
George Del Barrio - string conductor (1, 3, 8)
Paul Shure - concertmaster (1, 3, 8)
Ernie Watts - saxophone (1, 3, 8)
Buzz Brauner - flute (2, 3), piccolo (4, 5)
George Bohanon - trombone (1, 3, 8)
Oscar Brashear - trumpet (1, 3, 8)
Bert DeCoteaux - rhythm tracks, string and horn arrangements (2, 4-7)
Keith Howard - drums (2, 4-7)
Byron Gregory - electric guitar (2, 4-7)
Derf Reklaw-Raheem - percussion (2, 4-7)
Fred White - drums (3)
Victor Feldman - electric piano (3), percussion (3)
Ron Harris - bass (4-7)
Johnny Graham - guitar (8)

Produced by Larry Dunn (1, 3, 8) and Bert DeCoteaux (2, 4-7)
Mixed by Jack Rouben & Robert Fernandez (1, 3, 8) and Edward Sprigg & Michael Ruffo (2, 4-7)
Recording by Paul Serrano (2, 4-7)
Mastered by Ray Janos

References

1977 albums
Ramsey Lewis albums